Miccolamia inspinosa is a species of beetle in the family Cerambycidae. It was described by Takakuwa and N. Ohbayashi in 1995. It is known from Japan.

References

Desmiphorini
Beetles described in 1995